Carl Harrison "Stump" Merrill (born February 15, 1944) is a former manager in Major League Baseball.

Early life
Merrill was born in 1944 in Brunswick, Maine. He graduated from Brunswick High School, where he was a star in baseball, basketball, and American football despite being considered undersized.

Baseball career

As a player
Merrill began his baseball career as a catcher for the Maine Black Bears, where he also played football and earned a degree in physical education. He was selected by the Philadelphia Phillies in the  free-agent draft. He spent that season in the class-A New York–Penn League with the Batavia Clippers, and the following year with single-A teams in Bakersfield and Eugene. His playing career ended after the 1971 season due to a leg injury.

As a manager

For the 1984 season, he jumped to the triple-A level, managing the Columbus Clippers to another first-place finish.

During the  season, Merrill was sent to the Albany-Colonie Yankees, then the team's double-A affiliate in the Eastern League.

In , Merrill began the season with Columbus before getting the call to take charge of the New York Yankees in June when Bucky Dent was fired as manager. Merrill finished out what would be one of the worst seasons in Yankees history. The Yankees finished 67-95 (49-64 under Merrill), dead last in the American League and second-worst in baseball. It was only the fourth time that the storied franchise had finished with the worst record in the league. However, Merrill was not blamed for the debacle and was brought back for the  season—the first time in four years that the Yankees had a single manager for the entire season. However, after the Yankees could only improve to 71-91, he was replaced by Buck Showalter prior to the 1992 season and served that season as a roving minor-league instructor.

In , Merrill guided the Clippers for a third time, winning the International League title, the Governors' Cup. Along the way, Merrill won his 1000th game as a manager on August 2, 1996.

He retired in 2014.

Managerial record

Nickname
Merrill's nickname, "Stump," was given to him in 1963 by Jack Butterfield, his college baseball coach at Maine. Merrill recalled of the coining: "In my freshman year, we were walking out of the field house. I was with a tall pitcher who was about 6-foot-5. Just as we were outside, Jack Butterfield was trying to get my attention. He hollered at me three or four times and I didn't hear him. Finally he said, 'Hey Stump you little devil, turn around.' The pitcher heard it, and I guess it stuck."

References

External links

1944 births
Living people
New York Yankees managers
New York Yankees coaches
People from Brunswick, Maine
Brunswick High School (Maine) alumni
Maine Black Bears baseball players
San Diego Padres (minor league) players
Reading Phillies players
Batavia Trojans players
Bakersfield Bears players
Eugene Emeralds players
Tidewater Tides players
Maine Black Bears football players
Fort Lauderdale Yankees managers
Major League Baseball first base coaches
Nashville Sounds managers
Trenton Thunder managers
Baseball players from Maine
Baseball coaches from Maine